The 1898 Vermont gubernatorial election took place on September 6, 1898. Incumbent Republican Josiah Grout, per the "Mountain Rule", did not run for re-election to a second term as Governor of Vermont. Republican candidate Edward C. Smith defeated Democratic candidate Thomas W. Moloney to succeed him.

Results

References

Vermont
1898
Gubernatorial
September 1898 events